Janou is a given name. Notable people with the name include:

Janou Lefèbvre (born 1945), French equestrian show jumper
Janou Levels (born 2000), Dutch footballer
Janou Saint-Denis (1930-2000), Canadian poet, writer, actress, and director